In mathematics, in the realm of group theory, a quotientable automorphism of a group is an automorphism that takes every normal subgroup to within itself. As a result, it gives a corresponding automorphism for every quotient group.

All family automorphisms are quotientable, and particularly, all class automorphisms and power automorphisms are. As well, all inner automorphisms are quotientable, and more generally, any automorphism defined by an algebraic formula is quotientable.

Group automorphisms